The women's hammer throw event at the 2008 Summer Olympics took place on 18–20 August at the Beijing National Stadium.

The qualifying standards were 69.50 m (A standard) and 67.00 m (B standard).

In 2016, it was announced that reanalysis of samples from 2008 resulted in doping violations by Aksana Miankova and Darya Pchelnik being detected, and they were disqualified.  Medals have been reallocated by IAAF.

Schedule
All times are China standard time (UTC+8)

Records
Prior to the competition, the existing World and Olympic records were as follows.

The following new Olympic record was set during this competition:

Results

Qualifying round

Qualification: 71.50 (Q) or at least 12 best performers (q) advance to the final.

Finals

References

Athletics at the 2008 Summer Olympics
Hammer throw at the Olympics
2008 in women's athletics
Women's events at the 2008 Summer Olympics